Centro de Rescate Las Pumas (Las Pumas Rescue Center) is a  rural park of approximately 14 hectares (34 acres), located in southern Cañas, in the Guanacaste Province, Costa Rica.

The Las Pumas (cat) Rescue Center is located in an old farm land called Hacienda La Pacifica, in the heart of Area de Conservación Guanacaste World Heritage Site. Most animals are brought to the Rescue Center by government officials, rescued from human interaction. After rehabilitation, many species are reintroduced to the wild with approval of veterinary care.

See also 
 List of zoos by country: Costa Rica zoos

References 

Parks in Costa Rica
Urban public parks
Tourist attractions in Guanacaste Province
Zoos in Costa Rica